Blood of the Profit is an album by the American rapper Professor Griff. It was released in 1998 on Lethal/Blackheart/Mercury, and was produced by Professor Griff and Chuck D. The single, "The Ole Bitch-U-Worryz," which featured Chuck D, made it to No. 16 on the Hot Rap Singles and No. 66 on the Hot R&B/Hip-Hop Singles & Tracks.

The album was released a few months after Professor Griff rejoined Public Enemy. Its lyrical content was inspired by the deaths of Tupac Shakur and the Notorious B.I.G.

Track listing
"Red Reign"- 1:13
"The Ole Bitch-U-Worryz" feat. Chuck D- 4:21
"Common Thread"- 4:31
"Bitch Skit"- 0:16
"Black Beauty & the Bitch"- 4:03
"Vicious Cycle"- 4:08
"Where U At?"- 5:04
"Rosez n Thornz"- 5:31
"Blood of the Profit"- 1:07
"Field Nigguhz in a Huddle"- 4:26
"Imaginenation"- 5:03
"Point Blank"- 4:25
"The X-Y Chromozone Theory"- 4:03

References

Professor Griff albums
1998 albums
Blackheart Records albums
Mercury Records albums
PolyGram albums